Kala Prakash (2 January 1934 - 5 August 2018) was an Indian fiction writer and poetess of Sindhi language. She was a novelist, short story writer, and poetess. She authored more than 15 books and won the prestigious Sahitya Akademi Award  in 1994 from the Government of India.

Biography 
Kala was born on 2 January 1934 to a moderate family of Karachi, Sindh, British India (now Pakistan). She was only 13 when Pakistan was created and Sindhi Hindus had to leave their homeland. At that time, she was studying at Haridevi High School in Karachi. The deep pain of partition and bitter sense of homelessness can easily be felt in her writings. After migration to India, she studied at K.J. Khalnani High School. She got a master's degree from Jai Hind College Mumbai and entered into government service as an auditor. She continued this job till 1977. After getting a Diploma in Sindhi, she joined as a lecturer. During her teaching career, she always encouraged and inspired young girls to take up Sindhi literature.

Her first story Dohi Bedohi (ڏوهي بيڏوهي) was published in the literary magazine Naeen Dunya in 1953. Her first novel published in 1957 was Hik Dil Hazar Arman. In 1954, she was married to noted poet Moti Parkash. She moved to Dubai in 1980 to join her husband who was appointed there to manage Indian High School Dubai. After the retirement of her husband, they returned to India in 2002 and settled in Adipur.

Her short stories were published in various prominent literary magazines including Naeen Dunya, Sipoon, Rachna, and Hindwasi. She also wrote on the poetry of Shah Abdul Latif Bhittai and Sachal Sarmast. According to her, Shah Latif should be called the poet of people rather than that of mysticism.

Publications
Sources:

Novels 

 Hik Dil Hazar Arman, 1954
 Sheeshay Ji Dil, 1960
 Hayati Hotan Reea, 1975
 Waqat, Vithiyoon, Vichhotiyoon, 1988
 Arsi-a-Aado, 1992
 Pakhan Ji Preet, 1998
 Samund ain Kinaro, 2004
 Oakha Pandh Piyar Ja, 2010

Short story collections 

 Murk ain Mumta, 1973
 Varan men Gul, 1993
 Intizaar, 2008

Poetry collection 

 Mumta Joon Lahroon, 1963

Autobiography 

 Je Hianre Manjh Huran, 1987

Awards and honours
Sources:

 Akhil Bharat, Sindhi Boli, and Sahit Sabha Award, 1965
 Maharashtra Sindhi Sahitya Academy Award, 1992
 Sahitya Akademi Award, 1994
 Ishwari Jeevatram Buxani Award, 2001
 Priya Darshni Academy Award, 2010
 Sindhi Language Authority Award, 2011

Death 
She died on 5 August 2018 in Mumbai.

References 

1934 births
2018 deaths
20th-century Indian women writers
20th-century Indian writers
21st-century Indian women writers
21st-century Indian writers
Sindhi female writers
Sindhi-language writers
Writers from Mumbai
Writers from Karachi